Chandan Sharma is an Indian politician. He was a Member of Parliament, representing Himachal Pradesh in the Rajya Sabha, the upper house of India's Parliament, as a member of the  Indian National Congress.

References

Rajya Sabha members from Himachal Pradesh
1948 births
Indian National Congress politicians
Living people